Victor Kislyi is a digital entrepreneur of Belarusian origin, founder and CEO of the Wargaming.net. Resides in Cyprus. As of 2016, his net worth exceeded $1 bln.

Personal life 

Born on 3 August 1976 in Minsk. After school he entered the BSU's Faculty of Physics. Graduated with a degree in laser physics and spectroscopy. In 2012, he moved to Nicosia and received Cypriot citizenship.

Entrepreneurship 

Viktor Kyslyy created his first game in 1996. It was an online game based on chess, with parties played on a world map. As the industry was just beginning to develop, the game worked by email, but it could already be called a multiplayer game.

In 1998, Viktor Kyslyy and his friends founded 'Game Stream', originally an offshore programming company. In the same year, he registered 'Wargaming'. The first projects were 'DBA Online', 'Massive Assault' (2003), 'Operation Bagration' (2008) and 'Order of War' (2009). The first two games were not commercially successful. Great hopes were pinned on 'Operation Bagration' and its Western adaptation 'Order of War', but these projects barely managed to pay off their development.

A great success came with the World of Tanks, a massively multiplayer online game that was officially released on August 13, 2010. At first it was free, but later, when it started to gain popularity, microtransactions were introduced into the game. In 2012, Kislyi was chosen the Person of the Year 2012 by GamesIndustry International. January 21, 2013 the game set a world record among all games of the genre for the Guinness Book of Records: on that day there were 190 541 players on one of the five servers in the Russian cluster. Adaptations of the game were subsequently released for Xbox 360 and mobile phones. With the success and popularity of the game Viktor Kyslyy quickly joined the ranks of the richest businessmen in Belarus, rising higher and higher each new year. He topped the list of Belarus' most successful and influential businessmen in 2016 and 2017.

Following the success of WOT, two related games World of Warships and World of Warplanes were released later.

As of 2013, 64% of Wargaming was directly owned by Victor Kislyy, with another 25.5% controlled by his father, Vladimir Ivanovich Kislyy. In 2016, Bloomberg estimated the value of Kyslyy's company at $1.5 bln, while Kislyi's personal fortune exceeded $1bln. By 2019, the company had 17 offices around the world.

References 

Living people
Businesspeople from Minsk
1976 births